Reflection is the fourth studio album by Finnish rapper Redrama. It was released by Sony Music as a digital download on February 28, 2014. The album contains three hit singles: "Kickstart", "Clouds" (featuring AJ McLean) and "Let Go" (featuring Kristinia DeBarge), all reaching the top 5 of the Finnish music charts.

Track listing

References

2014 albums
Sony Music albums